Teacher Didn't Tell Me is a British television series which aired on the BBC during 1957. Hosted by Sidney Harrison, it was described in the Radio Times as "A musical revelation in three episodes".

Little else is known about the programme, though Harrison published an autobiographical book called Teacher never told me in 1961. Harrison also appeared in other BBC TV programming of the 1950s, including Piano Lesson and How to Play the Piano.

References

External links

1950s British music television series
1957 British television series debuts
1957 British television series endings
Lost BBC episodes
BBC Television shows
Black-and-white British television shows